Brainerd Jones (1865 – 1949) was an American architect who designed and built most of the architecturally significant buildings in Petaluma, California.

Jones is best known for designing three Carnegie libraries in Sonoma County, two of which are still remain standing and listed on the National Register of Historic Places. Jones also has seven other buildings which he contributed to and nine of which are on the National Register.

The overall importance and character of the Petaluma downtown can be partially attributed to Brainerd Jones' contribution. In Santa Rosa, Jones also designed many significant buildings including the Exchange Bank (now destroyed), the Saturday Afternoon Club, the Petaluma Women's Club building, the Lumsden House, and the Oates-Comstock House.

The D Street area has a wealth of important old houses, many of which are attributed to Brainerd Jones, including the Byce House, used for the filming of Peggy Sue Got Married; the Reynaud House as well as four other brick homes. Jones is known for his use of native stone in his buildings.

Other examples include: the 1917 Petaluma and Santa Rosa Electric Railway Depot (now the West County Museum) in Sebastopol, the 1922 addition to the C.C. Silk Mill in Petaluma, the 1911 remodel of the McNear Building in Petaluma and part of the McClay Building, the 1920 Petaluma Post Office (now a retail store), the Simon Pinschower House in Cloverdale,  and the 1922 Petaluma Golf and Country Club Clubhouse.

A number of his works are listed on the U.S. National Register of Historic Places.

Works include (attribution):
Ellis-Martin House, 1197 E. Washington St. Petaluma, CA (Jones, Brainerd), NRHP-listed
Free Public Library of Petaluma, 20 Fourth St. Petaluma, CA (Jones,Brainerd), NRHP-listed
Healdsburg Carnegie Library, 221 Matheson St. Healdsburg, CA (Jones,Brainerd), NRHP-listed
W. H. Lumsden House, 727 Mendocino St. Santa Rosa, CA (Jones,Brainerd), NRHP-listed
Erskine McNear B., 121 Knight Dr. San Rafael, CA (Jones,Brainerd), NRHP-listed
Old Petaluma Opera House, 147–149 Kentucky St. Petaluma, CA (Jones,Brainerd), NRHP-listed
Petaluma Silk Mill, 420 Jefferson St. Petaluma, CA (Jones,Brainerd), NRHP-listed
Sebastopol Depot of the Petaluma and Santa Rosa Railway, 261 S. Main St. Sebastopol, CA (Jones, Brainerd), NRHP-listed
First Congregational Church, 16 5th St. Petaluma, CA (Jones, Brainerd). Now home of the Unitarian Universalists of Petaluma.

References

Bibliography 
Rhinehart, Katherine J., Petaluma: A History in Architecture, Arcadia Publishing.
Munro-Fraser, J. P. Alley, Bowen and Company, History of Sonoma County: Including its geology, topography, mountains, valleys and streams. Salem, Mass. : Higginson Book Co.
Weinstein Dave, San Francisco Chronicle The man who built Petaluma: Brainerd Jones designed much of what is now the city's historic section, The Chronicle, Saturday, February 18, 2006.

External links 
Brainerd Jones at www.sonic.net
National Register #78000801:Old Petaluma Opera House in Sonoma County at www.noehill.com
National Register #88000924: Healdsburg Carnegie Library in Sonoma County at www.noehill.com
National Register #88000925: Free Public Library of Petaluma in Sonoma County at www.noehill.com
National Register #86000386: Petaluma Silk Mill in Sonoma County at www.noehill.com
National Register #83001245: W. H. Lumsden House in Sonoma County at www.noehill.com
National Register #82002276: Simon Pinschower House in Sonoma County at www.noehill.com
National Register #96000109: Sebastopol Depot of the Petaluma and Santa Rosa Railway in Sonoma County at www.noehill.com
Carnegie Libraries of California at carnegie-libraries.org
https://web.archive.org/web/20070929081051/http://www.krcb.org/television/on_demand/petaluma.htm
Petaluma Historical Society Website
McNear's Saloon with info about Lyman Byce.
Blue Label at the Belvedere In the stately Belvedere Building

1865 births
1949 deaths
19th-century American architects
History of Sonoma County, California
People from Santa Rosa, California
Petaluma, California
Architecture in the San Francisco Bay Area
20th-century American architects